David P. Sokola (born July 28, 1955) is an American politician and a Democratic member of the Delaware Senate since 1991, representing District 8. He earned a BS from the University of Delaware.

Elections
1990 When Republican Margo Ewing Bang retired and left the District 8 seat open, Sokola was unopposed for the 1990 Democratic Primary and won the November 6, 1990 General election with 6,738 votes (51%) against Republican nominee Frank Marx.
1992 Sokola was unopposed for the September 12, 1992 Democratic Primary and won the November 3, 1992 General election with 9,861 votes (62%) against Republican nominee Ronald Russo.
1996 Sokola was unopposed for the September 7, 1996 Democratic Primary and won the November 5, 1996 General election with 9,658 votes (61%) against Republican nominee Irwin Becnel.
2000 Sokola was unopposed for the September 9, 2000 Democratic Primary and won the November 7, 2000 General election with 9,873 votes (65.0%) against Republican nominee Paul Welsh.
2002 Sokola was unopposed for the September 10, 2002 Democratic Primary and won the November 5, 2002 General election with 6,411 votes (51.1%) against Republican nominee Michael Ramone.
2006 Sokola and Ramone were both unopposed for their September 12, 2006 primaries, setting up a rematch; Sokola won the November 7, 2006 General election with 7,678 votes (57.8%) against Ramone.
2010 Sokola was unopposed for the September 17, 2010 Democratic Primary and won the November 2, 2010 General election with 8,572 votes (60.6%) against Republican nominee A. Louis Saindon.
2012 Sokola was unopposed for the September 11, 2012 Democratic Primary and won the November 6, 2012 General election with 10,099 votes (60.7%) against Republican nominee William Stritzinger.
2016 Sokola was unopposed for the September 6, 2016 Democratic Primary and won the November 8, 2016 General election with 8,862 votes (50.8%) against Republican nominee Meredith Chapman and Green nominee David B. Chandler.

References

External links
Official page at the Delaware General Assembly
Campaign site
 

1955 births
21st-century American politicians
Democratic Party Delaware state senators
Living people
People from Newark, Delaware
People from Wilmington, Delaware